Pi Hydrae, Latinized from π Hydrae, is a star in the constellation Hydra with an apparent visual magnitude of 3.3, making it visible to the naked eye.

The spectrum of this star shows it to have a stellar classification of K1 III-IV, with the luminosity class of 'III-IV' suggesting it is in an evolutionary transition stage somewhere between a subgiant and a giant star. It has a low projected rotational velocity of 2.25 km s−1. Pi Hydrae is radiating energy from its outer envelope with an effective temperature of 4,670 K, giving it the orange hue of a K-type star.

Pi Hydrae is a type of giant known as a cyanogen-weak star, which means that its spectrum displays weak absorption lines of CN− relative to the metallicity. (The last is a term astronomers use when describing the abundance of elements other than hydrogen and helium.) Otherwise, it appears to be a normal star of its evolutionary class, having undergone first dredge-up of nuclear fusion by-products onto its surface layers. At its estimated distance, this yields a physical size of about 12–13 times the radius of the Sun. It has an estimated mass of 2.45 times the mass of the Sun.

References

External links

K-type giants
K-type subgiants
Hydra (constellation)
Hydrae, Pi
Durchmusterung objects
Hydrae, 49
123123
068895
5827